USS Heath Hen (AMc-6) was a wooden dragger (trawler), built in 1936 by A. D. Storey, Fairhaven, Massachusetts, as Noreen. Acquired by the United States Navy on 18 October 1940, she was converted to a coastal minesweeper and commissioned on 20 January 1941 as USS Heath Hen (AMc-6). The small ship served in the 5th Naval District until 16 March 1944 when she arrived Provincetown, Massachusetts, for duty with the Naval Mine Test Facility. Redesignated Small Boat C-13538, her name was dropped and she served in mine warfare experiments until damaged by an oil explosion on 16 March 1945. She was subsequently turned over to the Maritime Commission and sold on 10 May 1948.

References

External links
 

Merchant ships of the United States
Ships built in Fairhaven, Massachusetts
1936 ships
Minesweepers of the United States Navy
World War II minesweepers of the United States